Gregory Carlton Orton (born December 17, 1986) is a former American football wide receiver. He was signed by the Cincinnati Bengals as an undrafted free agent in 2009. He played college football at Purdue.

He was also a member of the Spokane Shock, Denver Broncos, Omaha Nighthawks, Arizona Rattlers, and New England Patriots.

Early life
Greg attended Wayne High School, where he was a standout football, basketball and track and field member. As a member of the football team, he played for coach Jay Minton. He was ranked as the No. 19 wide receiver in nation by SuperPrep as well as the No. 53 wide receiver in nation and the No. 21 player in Ohio by Rivals.com. He was a first-team all-state selection as senior, when he caught 65 passes for 1,058 yards (16.3 average) and nine touchdowns. As a result, he was named to CBS SportsLine All-Regional team. He had 59 receptions for 782 yards (13.3 average) and 11 touchdowns his junior season, and was a two-time all-area and all-conference honoree.

Orton committed to Purdue University on September 22, 2004.

College career
Orton chose Purdue to continue his football career. He chose Purdue over Cincinnati, Iowa, Michigan State, Pittsburgh, Virginia and Wisconsin. Orton saw his production steadily increase every season. He finished his Purdue career appearing in 50 games and recorded 203 receptions (fifth in school history) for 2,356 yards (sixth in school history) and 13 touchdowns.

Statistics
Source:

Professional career

Cincinnati Bengals
In 2009, Orton signed as an undrafted free agent with the Cincinnati Bengals, after failing to have his name called in the 2009 NFL Draft.

Spokane Shock
In 2010, Orton signed to play with the Spokane Shock of the Arena Football League. He appeared in a few games making 18 receptions for 2 touchdowns, helping guide the Shock to an ArenaBowl XXIII championship. In 2011, he saw his number increase dramatically, but the Shock season wasn't as productive. As a member of the Shock, Orton led the team in receptions (120), receiving yards (1,588), and touchdowns (37).

Omaha Nighthawks
In August 2011, he signed with the Omaha Nighthawks of the United Football League.

Denver Broncos
On August 13, 2011, Orton signed with the Denver Broncos. He was later waived by the Denver Broncos prior to the 2011 season.

Arizona Rattlers
Orton signed with the Arizona Rattlers to play the 2012 season.

Denver Broncos (second stint)
Orton was re-signed by the Broncos, as a member of the practice squad on November 29, 2012.

He was waived/injured by the Denver Broncos on August 25, 2013. He reverted to injured reserve on August 27. He was released by the Broncos on October 7, 2013.

New England Patriots
Orton was signed by the New England Patriots to their practice squad on December 31, 2013. The team released him on May 22, 2014, but re-signed him on July 23 of that year. Orton was waived/injured by the Patriots on July 27, 2014. He reverted to injured reserve on July 28. He won Super Bowl XLIX with the Patriots after they defeated the defending champion Seattle Seahawks 28–24. He became a free agent after the 2014 season.

References

1986 births
Living people
American football wide receivers
Purdue Boilermakers football players
Cincinnati Bengals players
Spokane Shock players
Omaha Nighthawks players
Denver Broncos players
Arizona Rattlers players
New England Patriots players
Players of American football from Dayton, Ohio
People from Huber Heights, Ohio